Ambrogio Spinola Doria, 1st Marquess of Los Balbases and 1st Duke of Sesto (1569 – 25 September 1630) was an Italian condottiero and nobleman of the Republic of Genoa, who served as a Spanish general and won a number of important battles. He is often called "Ambrosio" by Spanish-speaking people and is considered one of the greatest military commanders of his time and in the history of the Spanish army. His military achievements earned him the title of Marquess of Los Balbases in the Spanish peerage, as well as the Order of the Golden Fleece and Order of Santiago.

Early life
Ambrogio Spinola was born in Genoa, the eldest son of Filippo Spinola, Marquis of Sexten and Venafro, and his wife Polissena Grimaldi, daughter of Nicolò prince of Salerno. The family of Spinola was of great antiquity, wealth and power in Genoa. Don Ambrogio's sister Donna Lelia was married to Don Giulio Cesare Squarciafico, 2nd Marquess of Galatone, from whom descend the Princes of Belmonte.

In the 16th century the Italian Republic of Genoa was in practical terms a protected state of the Spanish Empire; the Genoese were the bankers of the Spanish monarchy and had control of its finances. Several of the younger brothers of Ambrogio Spinola sought their fortune in Spain, and one of them, Federico, distinguished himself greatly as a soldier in the Army of Flanders. 
As eldest brother, Ambrogio remained at home to marry and continue the family. In 1592 he was married to Giovanna Bacciadonne, daughter of the count of Galerata.

Spanish service

The houses of Spinola and Doria were rivals for authority within the republic. Ambrogio Spinola continued the rivalry with the count of Tursi, then the chief of the Dorias. He was not successful, and having lost a lawsuit into which he had entered to enforce a right of pre-emption of a palace belonging to the Salerno family which the Doria wished to purchase, he decided to withdraw from the city and advance the fortunes of his house by serving the Spanish monarchy in Flanders. In 1602 he and his brother Federico entered into a contract with the Spanish government—a condotta on the old Italian model. It was a speculation on which Spinola risked the whole of the great fortune of his house. Ambrogio Spinola undertook to raise 9.000 Lombard mercenaries for land service, and Federico to form a squadron of galley ships for service on the coast.

Several of Federico's galleys were destroyed by English and Dutch war-ships; first at Sesimbra in June and then in October in the English Channel. He himself was slain in an action with the Dutch on 24 May 1603. Ambrogio Spinola marched overland to Flanders in 1602 with the men he had raised at his own expense. During the first months of his stay in Flanders the Spanish government played with schemes for employing him on an invasion of England, which came to nothing. At the close of the year he returned to Italy for more men. His experience as a soldier did not begin until, as General, and at the age of thirty-four, he undertook to continue the Siege of Ostend on 29 September 1603. Despite failing to relieve Sluis under siege at the same time, the ruins of Ostend fell into his hands on 22 September 1604. For this victory, he was appointed a Knight of the Order of the Golden Fleece in 1605.

War in Flanders
The governor of Flanders Archduke Albert and the Infanta Clara Eugenia, daughter of Philip II, who had set their hearts on taking Ostend, were delighted at Spinola's success, and it won him a high reputation among the soldiers of the time. At the close of the campaign he went to Spain to meet with the court, then in Valladolid, and make arrangements for the continuation of the war. At Valladolid he insisted on being appointed commander-in-chief in Flanders. By April he was back in Brussels to lead his first campaign. At this period, the wars of the Low Countries consisted almost entirely of sieges, and Spinola made himself famous by the number of places he took in spite of the efforts of Maurice of Nassau to defend them, including heavily fortified Groenlo.

In 1606 he again went to Spain. He was received with much outward honour, and entrusted with a very secret mission to secure the government of Flanders in case of the death of the Archduke or his wife. However he could not obtain the grandeeship which he desired, and was compelled to pledge his entire fortune as security for the expenses of the war before the bankers would advance funds to the Spanish government. He was never repaid, resulting in his complete financial ruin. The Spanish government now had a reason to keep him away from Spain. Until the signing of the Twelve Years' Truce in 1609, he continued to command in the field with general success. After it was signed he retained his post, and had among other duties to conduct the negotiations with France when Henry II de Bourbon, Prince de Condé fled to Flanders with his wife, Charlotte-Marguerite de Montmorency, in order to put her beyond the reach of the admiration of the older Henry IV of France.

By 1611 Spinola's financial ruin was complete, but he was given the aristocratic title, a Grandeza, which he had sought. In 1614 he was involved with operations connected with the settlement of Cleves and Jülich. From 1620 to 1622, in the Thirty Years' War, he led the Palatinate campaign in the Lower Palatinate, which included the capture of many towns and villages, including Drais, and was rewarded with the rank of Captain-General.

After the renewal of the war in the Low Countries in 1621 he had the most renowned victory of his career, the capture of Breda. Success came after a long siege (28 August 16245 June 1625), in spite of the objections of Philip IV of Spain, who thought the siege was too risky and expensive, and the strenuous efforts of Maurice of Nassau, Prince of Orange to save it. The surrender of Breda is the subject of a famous painting by Velázquez, known as Las Lanzas.

Capture of Breda
 
Spinola captured the city after a prolonged siege. After its surrender, he gave safe passage to its leaders and soldiers, who were allowed to leave the city with their banners and arms. An extraordinary and magnanimous gesture that made Spinola famous throughout Europe. The gesture was understood as true Christian benevolence. It is this benevolence that is depicted in Velázquez' work. Spinola famously argued that "El valor del vencido es la gloria del vencedor" ("The valor of the defeated is the glory of the victor").
The taking of Breda was the culmination of Spinola's career. Utter want of money paralysed the Spanish government, and the new favourite, Olivares, was jealous of the general. Spinola could not prevent Frederick Henry of Nassau from taking Groll (or Groenlo) in 1627, a good set-off for Breda. In January 1628 he left for Spain, resolved not to resume the command in Flanders unless security was given him for the support of his army. At Madrid he had to endure much insolence from Olivares, who endeavoured to make him responsible for the loss of Groll. Spinola was resolute not to return to Flanders.

Death
Meanwhile, the Spanish government added a war over the succession to the Duchy of Mantua to its heavy burdens. Spinola was appointed as plenipotentiary and general. He landed at Genoa on 19 September 1629. With him, at the suggestion of painter Peter Paul Rubens, came the Spanish royal painter Diego Velázquez, who went with him to see famous paintings in Genoa, Milan, Venice and Rome.  In Italy he was pursued by the enmity of the Conde-Duque of Olivares,  curiously enough, born in Rome in 1587, where his father, don Enrique de Guzmán y Ribera, a cadet child from one of Spain's oldest noble families, was the Spanish ambassador,  as was also his patron Spinola, who caused him to be deprived of his powers as plenipotentiary.

Spinola's health broke down, as he was already 61 years old, with over 30 years' experience in the battle fields,  and died on 25 September 1630 at the Siege of Casale, muttering, apparently, the words "honour" and "reputation."

The title of "Marquess of Los Balbases", still borne by his representatives in Spain, was all that his family received for the vast fortune they spent in the service of Philip III and IV. He would be painted however after his death, by Diego Velázquez, in 1635, as ordered by Felipe IV, in The Surrender of Breda.

Spinola was a brilliant field commander, whose daring in battle often was used to outflank his opponents and catch them off guard.  He was not a great technical innovator, but was a master of military skills.  He used rapid movement and pell-mell actions in his battles.  He was skilled at picking out an enemy's weakest spot and applying force there to achieve victory.

Family

Spinola and Giovanna Bacciadonne had three children:
 Filippo (15948 August 1659), 2nd Marquess of Balbases and his successor.
 Polissena (died 1639), married Diego Felipe de Guzmán, 1st Marquess of Leganés, Governor of Flanders.
 Agustin (159712 February 1649), Bishop of Tortosa 1625, Archbishop of Granada 1627, Archbishop of Santiago de Compostela 1630, Archbishop of Sevilla 1645.

References

Sources
 
 
 
 Genealogía de la familia y del apellido Spinola (in Spanish) 

1569 births
1630 deaths
Doria family
Generals of former Italian states
Governors of the Duchy of Milan
Grandees of Spain
Italian people of the Eighty Years' War
Military personnel of the Thirty Years' War
Knights of Santiago
Knights of the Golden Fleece
16th-century condottieri
Spanish generals
Spanish people of Italian descent
Ambrogio
16th-century Genoese people
17th-century condottieri
People of the Anglo-Spanish War (1625–1630)
Italian people of the Thirty Years' War